Elections to Lancashire County Council were held in May 1889. The council was newly created, and at the time covered the entire administrative county of Lancashire.

Party politics played a limited role in Lancashire politics at the time, and would remain limited until the First World War. As a result, the election saw limited competition, with only 38.1% of divisions contested, in contrast to the 56.3% average across England & Wales in the 1889 local elections.

The limited role of party politics was also seen in the composition of the council leadership, with the first county Chairman being J. T. Hibbert, a Liberal, while his Vice-Chairman, C. R. Jackson, was a Conservative.

Results

By ward

References

Lancashire
1889
1880s in Lancashire
May 1889 events